Julien Levy (1906–1981) was an art dealer and owner of Julien Levy Gallery in New York City, important as a venue for Surrealists, avant-garde artists, and American photographers in the 1930s and 1940s.

Biography
Levy was born in New York on January 22, 1906.  After studying museum administration at Harvard under Paul J. Sachs, Levy dropped out shortly before graduating, and moved to New York. There he met Marcel Duchamp. In 1926 he traveled to Paris with Duchamp, and befriended Man Ray and Berenice Abbott, through whom he came into possession of a portion of Eugène Atget's personal archive.  In Paris in 1927, he also met artist and writer Mina Loy and was married to Loy's daughter, Joella Haweis.  
 
The couple returned to New York, where Levy worked briefly at the Weyhe Gallery before establishing his own New York gallery at 602 Madison Avenue in 1931.  Concentrating at first on photography, he staged Man Ray's first major show, introduced Henri Cartier-Bresson to the US, and promoted many other European and American figures.  On January 29, 1932, there came the landmark multi-media Surrealist exhibition of the work of Pablo Picasso, Max Ernst, Joseph Cornell, Marcel Duchamp, and the introduction of Salvador Dalí's The Persistence of Memory (which Levy owned). He also championed the surrealist work of Leon Kelly. This exhibition marks the first in New York to display the works of members of the official surrealist group.  

In 1937, the gallery moved to 15 East 57th Street, where Levy mounted the first solo exhibition of the work of Frida Kahlo, November 1 to 15, 1938.   From 1943 to 1949, the gallery was located at 42 East 57th Street. 

Levy and Haweis were divorced in 1942. In 1944, Julien Levy married again, to surrealist artist Muriel Streeter. His connections with many other artists during this period of the 1930s and 1940s allowed Streeter to gain helpful insight with her own work during this time spent in and around Levy's New York gallery. 

In 1945, Arshile Gorky had his first solo show there. In 1947, Paul Delvaux had an exhibition of paintings, which was well-received by critics.

The gallery closed in 1949. Levy moved to Connecticut, and married a third time, to Jean Farley McLaughlin. He wrote and taught at Sarah Lawrence College and State University of New York at Purchase.  Levy's books include Memoir of an Art Gallery and Surrealism'. 

Julien Levy died on February 10, 1981.

References

External links 
 finding aid for Levy's papers at the Philadelphia Museum of Art

1906 births
1981 deaths
Modern art
American art dealers
People associated with the Philadelphia Museum of Art